The Oregon Trail is a 1959 American CinemaScope and colour Western film directed by Gene Fowler Jr. and starring Fred MacMurray, William Bishop and Nina Shipman.

The film's sets were designed by the art directors John B. Mansbridge and Lyle R. Wheeler.

Plot
In the midst of the Oregon boundary dispute, the President James K. Polk is secretly sending military agents, disguised as pioneers, west on the Oregon Trail so that they may protect American settlers in the event of war with British North America. Rumors of this conspiracy reach James Gordon Bennett Sr. at the New York Herald. He assigns one of his reporters, Neal Harris, to go on the Oregon Trail himself and find out the truth. On the trail, Harris befriends the eccentric Zachariah Garrison, who is bringing apple trees to Oregon. Harris clashes with Capt. George Wayne, the leader of Polk's agents, and they become involved in a love triangle over a young pioneer woman named Prudence Cooper. After they survive various hardships on the trail, Harris discovers who Wayne really is and declares that he will expose the military buildup in Oregon. Wayne tries to have Harris arrested, but he escapes.

Upon arriving at Fort Laramie, Wayne discovers that their mission has become moot with the signing of the Oregon Treaty and the commencement of the Mexican–American War. Not realizing this, Harris goes with a mountain man named Gabe Hastings to hide with the Arapaho. It turns out that Hastings and the Arapaho are hostile to the pioneers, but Harris escapes with the help of Hastings' half-Arapaho daughter Shona. They warn Fort Laramie in time, and the film concludes with a climactic battle against the Arapaho. Fort Laramie is successfully defended, but Garrison is killed. Harris resigns from being a reporter, so that he may continue on to Oregon with Garrison's apple trees. Shona renounces her people and joins Harris. Prudence ends up with Wayne, who is now heading off to join the war against Mexico.

Cast

Production
The film was shot in May 1959. It was financed by Robert L. Lippert who made B films for Fox; The Oregon Trail was more expensive than most of his films, being budgeted at around $300,000. Lippert said the film "won't lose" but could "have used another $100,000."

Gene Fowler had made a number of Westerns for Lippert. He remembered The Oregon Trail as being "a son of a bitch – Lippert really screwed that one up. He made a bet with Spyros Skouras that he could make a big outdoor Western without ever leaving the Fox lot and like an idiot I agreed to direct it."

Reception
The Los Angeles Times called the film "below standard".

See also
 List of American films of 1959

References

Bibliography
 Pitts, Michael R. Western Movies: A Guide to 5,105 Feature Films. McFarland, 2012.

External links
 

1959 films
1959 Western (genre) films
1950s historical films
American historical films
American Western (genre) films
Films directed by Gene Fowler Jr.
20th Century Fox films
CinemaScope films
Films set in the 1840s
Films set in Oregon
Films scored by Paul Dunlap
1950s English-language films
1950s American films